Nico Brandenburger (born 17 January 1995) is a German professional footballer who plays as a defensive midfielder for 1. FC Kaan-Marienborn.

He has been a youth international for Germany on multiple levels, most recently for the under-20 team in 2015.

Club career
On 19 May 2019, Preußen Münster announced that they had signed Brandenburger for the upcoming 2019–20 season.

References

1995 births
Living people
Association football midfielders
German footballers
Footballers from Berlin
Germany youth international footballers
Borussia Mönchengladbach players
Borussia Mönchengladbach II players
FC Luzern players
SC Fortuna Köln players
SC Preußen Münster players
1. FC Kaan-Marienborn players
Regionalliga players
3. Liga players
German expatriate footballers
German expatriate sportspeople in Switzerland
Expatriate footballers in Switzerland